James Parker Coombs (June 6, 1869 – February 22, 1935), also known as Big Jim or Daddy Jim, was the head coach of the University of Maine's football team in 1898 and compiled a 1–4 record. Coombs later went on to be a singer in New York.

Head coaching record

References

1869 births
1935 deaths
19th-century players of American football
American football centers
Brown Bears football players
Maine Black Bears football coaches
Sportspeople from Augusta, Maine
Coaches of American football from Maine
Players of American football from Maine